, formerly Toshiba Client Solutions Co., Ltd., is a Japanese personal computer manufacturer owned by Sharp Corporation; it was owned by, and branded as, Toshiba from 1958 to 2018. It claims its Toshiba T1100, launched in 1985, as the first mass-market laptop PC. Toshiba had used the brand name "DynaBook" or "dynabook" since 1989, but Dynabook became the worldwide brand in 2019.

History

The company began as Kawasaki Typewriter Co., Ltd. in 1954, but was bought by Tokyo Shibaura Electric Co., Ltd. (later Toshiba Corporation).  Its name was changed to Toshiba Typewriter Co., Ltd. in 1958, Toshiba Business Machines Company in 1968, Toshiba Information Systems Corporation in 1984 after merging in Toshiba Business Computers Company, and Toshiba Client Solutions Co., Ltd. in 2016.

Toshiba era

The dynabook was a portable computer concept first introduced by Alan C. Kay in the 1960s and 1970s.  Tetsuya Mizoguchi, an executive in Toshiba's mainframe computer division, read Kay's paper "Personal Dynamic Media" in the March 1977 IEEE Computer; and inspired by the concept of a computer that could be carried and used by anyone of any age, Mizoguchi became determined to develop such a computer.

The Dynabook trademark was already owned by other companies in Japan and the United States: Toshiba didn't use the name in the U.S., but ASCII Corporation had acquired the rights in Japan, so Toshiba paid a fee to ASCII to use the name there.  The trademark rights in Britain, France, and West Germany were also able to be acquired.

The first Toshiba computer with the name DynaBook was announced on June 26, 1989.  In August 1989, Mizoguchi sent a letter and a Toshiba DynaBook T1000SE to Kay in Boston, and in December Kay was Mizoguchi's guest at Toshiba.  In 1990, the T1000SE became mandatory for all 82 students at Methodist Ladies' College, Melbourne.

Sharp era
In 2018, Toshiba Corporation was in the midst of an accounting scandal, and was under pressure to cut costs; Toshiba Client Solutions Co., Ltd., became 80.1% owned by Sharp Corporation, in turn majority-owned by Foxconn;  Sharp paid $36 million for the shares.  TCS then changed its corporate name to Dynabook.  Sharp exercised a call option on the remaining 19.9% of the shares on June 30, 2020, making Dynabook wholly owned by Sharp in August 2020, and indicated plans for Dynabook to have an initial public offering in 2020 or 2021.

Product lineup

Current
E series – consumer laptops (since 2019)
Portégé – ultrabooks, formerly subnotebooks (1994–2016, 2019–present)
Satellite Pro – prosumer laptops (1994–2016, 2020–present)
Tecra – business laptops (1994–2016, 2019–present)

Former

Libretto – handheld subnotebooks (1996–2002, 2005, 2010)
Qosmio – gaming laptops (2004–2014)
Satellite – consumer laptops (1992–2016)

T1100 (1985)
T3100 (1986)
T1200 (1987)
T1000 (1987)

Gallery of products

References

External links

  (redirects based on region)

 
Sharp Corporation divisions and subsidiaries
Computer companies of Japan
Japanese companies established in 1954
Manufacturing companies based in Tokyo
 
 
 
 
2018 mergers and acquisitions